The Blackpool Reform Jewish Congregation is a Reform Judaism congregation in Blackpool, Lancashire, England.

History
With a synagogue located on Raikes Parade, Blackpool Reform Jewish Congregation was founded in 1947 and was originally a member of the Union of Liberal and Progressive Synagogues. It is now a constituent synagogue of the Movement for Reform Judaism with which it has been associated since 1961.

It is also a member of the Board of Deputies of British Jews, the Jewish Representative Council of Greater Manchester and Region and the Blackpool Faith Forum.

In October 2005 Michael Howard visited the synagogue on the day he gave his final speech as leader of the Conservative Party at its annual Party Conference in Blackpool. He was called up to the Torah during a first day Rosh Hashanah service at the synagogue.

Communications
The synagogue publishes a quarterly magazine, Migdal.

Rabbi
Rabbi Norman Zalud is the community's rabbi. He also serves the community of Manchester's Sha'arei Shalom synagogue and, until 2007, was rabbi of the Liverpool Reform Synagogue.

He has worked with the Blackpool Reform community for the last 40 years. He teaches special needs children at Delemere Forest School, is prison chaplain for all faiths in eleven prisons in the north west of England and Jewish chaplain to Southport and District Hospital.

Rabbi Zalud trained as a cantor at Guildhall School of Music and then at Jews' College, where he received a minister's qualification before going to Leo Baeck College. He received semikhah in 1993.

See also
Blackpool United Hebrew Congregation
 List of Jewish communities in the United Kingdom
 Movement for Reform Judaism

References

External links
Official website
Blackpool Reform Jewish Congregation at GENUKI
The Movement for Reform Judaism's Official Website
Blackpool Reform Jewish Congregation on Jewish Communities and Records – UK (hosted by jewishgen.org).

1947 establishments in England
Jewish organizations established in 1947
Judaism in England
Reform synagogues in the United Kingdom
Religion in Lancashire
Synagogues in Blackpool